Kaia Kanepi was the defending champion, but lost in the first round to Amra Sadiković.

Laura Siegemund won the title, defeating Romina Oprandi in the final, 7–5, 6–3.

Seeds

Main draw

Finals

Top half

Bottom half

References 
 Main draw

Engie Open de Biarritz - Singles